Pierre Attaingnant (or Attaignant) (c. 1494 – late 1551 or 1552) was a French music publisher, active in Paris.

Life
Attaingnant is considered to be first large-scale publisher of single-impression movable type for music-printing, thus making it possible to print faster and cheaper than predecessors such as Ottaviano Petrucci.  Attaingnant is often credited with being the first to develop this technique; however, theoric assert exists to suggest that John Rastell, an English printer in London, was the first to use single-impression printing in 1520. Unfortunately, none of his scores were ever found. Attaingnant published over 1500 chansons by many different composers, including Paris composers Claudin de Sermisy, Pierre Sandrin and Pierre Certon, and most prominently Clément Janequin with five books of chansons by Josquin Desprez . Attaingnant acquired royal privileges for his music books, which were renewed many times.  Eventually he was named imprimeur et libraire du Roy en musique (printer and bookseller of the King for music).

Works
Attaingnant's major contribution to music printing consists in his popularizing the single-impression method for music printing, which he first employed in his 1528 publication Chansons nouvelles en musique à quatre parties. In this system, the individual notes were printed directly onto segments of staff, and so the notes, staff lines, and text could all be printed with one send through the printing press. The main disadvantage of this method was the alignment of the staff lines, which often had a “bumpy” look—-some being slightly higher or slightly disjointed from others. Nevertheless, this method became standard music printing across Europe in the 16th and 17th centuries.

Attaingnant learnt the printing trade by printing first "livres d'heure" with the printer Philippe Pigouchet who sold them to Simon Vostre book shop located in St John the evangelist street near the Sorbonne University in the Parisian student district. Later Pigouchet became Attaingnant's father in law when he married his daughter

Apart from his 36 collections of chansons, he also published books with pieces in lute or keyboard tablature, as well as Masses and motets.

Among the most important documents for keyboard music in general and for French Renaissance keyboard music in particular are the seven volumes published by Attaingnant in Paris in the spring of 1531:

 Dixneuf chansons musicales reduictes en la tabulature des Orgues Espinettes Manichordions, et telz semblables instrumentz musicaulx... Idibus Januraii 1530 (sic).
 Vingt et cinq chansons musicales reduictes en la tabulature des Orgues Espinettes Manichordions, et telz semblables instrumentz musicaulx... Kal. 1530 (sic).
 Vingt et six chansons musicales reduictes en la tabulature des Orgues Espinettes Manichordions, et telz semblables instrumentz musicaulx... Non. Frebruaii 1530 (sic).
 Quatorze Gaillardes neuf Pavennes, sept Branles et deux Basses Dances le tout reduict de musique en la tabulature du jeu d'Orgues Espinettes Manicordions et telz semblables instrumentz musicaulx... (February 1531 ?).
 Tabulature pour le jeu d’Orgues, Espinettes et Manicordions sur le plain chant de Cunctipotens et Kyrie Fons. Avec leurs Et in terra, Patrem, Sanctus et Agnus Dei... (March 1531).
 Magnificat sur les huit tons avec Te Deum laudamus et deux Preludes, le tout mys en tabulature des Orgues Espinettes et Manicordions, et telz semblables instrumentz... Kal. Martii 1530.
 Treze Motetz musicaulx avec ung Prelude, le tout reduict en la Tabulature des Orgues Espinettes et Manicordions et telz semblables instrumentz... Kal. Aprilis 1531.

In popular culture
One of the pieces published by Attaingnant has been used three times in 20th- and 21st-century popular music:

 "Donna ti voglio cantare" by Italian singer-songwriter Angelo Branduardi, recorded in his 1979 album Cogli la prima mela;
 "Play Minstrel Play" by Renaissance band Blackmore's Night, in their 1997 album Shadow of the Moon;
 "The March Of The Swordmaster" by Rhapsody, included in their 2002 album Power of the Dragonflame.

Another melody published by Attaingnant is used in several songs:
 "Eternal Wait" by Finnish Folk metal band "Ensiferum";
 "Ethelion" by British Progressive Rock band "Gryphon";
 "O Sonar das Augas" by Spanish Neoclassical darkwave band "Narsilion";
 "Tourdion" by German medieval folk bands "Die Streuner", "Corvus Corax" and "dArtagnan".
The original can be heard below, in the first sample, Quand je bois du vin clairet. An alternative version for lute solo also exists, in Attaingnant's printed works.

{{listen
 | filename     = Basse Danse Attaignant.ogg 
 | title        = Basse Danse
 | description  = from Suite de Danses du Recueil
 | format       = ogg
}}

References

D. W. Krummel and Stanley Sadie, Music Printing and Publishing. New York: W. W. Norton, 1990.

Further reading
 Heartz, Daniel. Pierre Attaingnant, Royal Printer of Music: A Historical Study and Bibliographical Catalogue''. Berkeley: University of California Press, 1969.

External links
 
 
 Free scores (Kantoreiarchiv)
 Listen to free recordings of songs from Umeå Akademiska Kör.

1490s births
1550s deaths
Renaissance music printers
French music publishers (people)
16th-century French businesspeople